The Tampa Bay Lightning are a professional ice hockey team based in Tampa, Florida. They are members of the Atlantic Division of the Eastern Conference of the National Hockey League (NHL). The first entry draft they participated in was in 1992, where they selected Roman Hamrlik first overall. Since 1992, they have drafted 190 players from 13 different nations.

The NHL Entry Draft is held each June, allowing teams to select players who have turned 18 years old by September 15 in the year the draft is held. The draft order is determined by the previous season's order of finish, with non-playoff teams drafting first, followed by the teams that made the playoffs, with the specific order determined by the number of points earned by each team. The NHL holds a weighted lottery for the 14 non-playoff teams, allowing the winner to move up a maximum of four positions in the entry draft. The team with the fewest points has the best chance of winning the lottery, with each successive team given a lower chance of moving up in the draft. Between 1986 and 1994, the NHL also held a Supplemental Draft for players in American colleges.

The Lightning have held the first overall pick three times in franchise history. They have used these picks to select Roman Hamrlik in 1992, Vincent Lecavalier in 1998 and Steven Stamkos in 2008. They also selected first in the 1992 NHL Supplemental Draft, where they chose defenseman Cory Cross. When they won the Stanley Cup in 2003–04, only five of the 25 who dressed for Game 7 were drafted by Tampa Bay. When the Lightning won their second Stanley Cup in 2020, the roster consisted of considerably more Lightning draft picks. That roster had 12 Lightning draft picks and 3 undrafted players that developed in their system.

Key

Statistics are complete as of the 2021–22 NHL season and show each player's career regular season totals in the NHL.  Wins, losses, ties, overtime losses and goals against average apply to goaltenders and are used only for players at that position.

First round picks

Supplemental Draft Picks

1992 Draft picks

Tampa Bay's draft picks at the 1992 NHL Entry Draft held on June 20, 1992, at the Montreal Forum in Montreal.

1993 Draft picks

Tampa Bay's draft picks at the 1993 NHL Entry Draft held on June 26, 1993, at the Colisée de Québec in Quebec City, Quebec.

1994 Draft picks

Tampa Bay's draft picks at the 1994 NHL Entry Draft held on June 28 and 29, 1994, at the Hartford Civic Center in Hartford, Connecticut.

1995 Draft picks

Tampa Bay's draft picks at the 1995 NHL Entry Draft held on July 28, 1995, at Edmonton Coliseum in Edmonton, Alberta.

1996 Draft picks

Tampa Bay's draft picks from the 1996 NHL Entry Draft held on June 22, 1996, at the Kiel Center in St. Louis, Missouri.

1997 Draft picks

Tampa Bay's draft picks from the 1997 NHL Entry Draft held on June 21, 1997, at the Pittsburgh Civic Arena in Pittsburgh, Pennsylvania.

1998 Draft picks

Tampa Bay's draft picks from the 1998 NHL Entry Draft held on June 27, 1998, at the Marine Midland Arena in Buffalo, New York.

1999 Draft picks

Tampa Bay's draft picks from the 1999 NHL Entry Draft held on June 26, 1999, at the FleetCenter in Boston.

2000 Draft picks

Tampa Bay's draft picks from the 2000 NHL Entry Draft held on June 24 and 25, 2000, at the Saddledome in Calgary, Alberta.

2001 Draft picks

Tampa Bay's draft picks from the 2001 NHL Entry Draft held on June 23 and 24, 2001, at the National Car Rental Center in Sunrise, Florida.

2002 Draft picks

Tampa Bay's draft picks from the 2002 NHL Entry Draft held on June 22 and 23, 2002, at the Air Canada Centre in Toronto, Ontario.

2003 Draft picks

Tampa Bay's draft picks from the 2003 NHL Entry Draft held on June 21 and 22, 2003, at the Gaylord Entertainment Center in Nashville, Tennessee.

2004 Draft picks

Tampa Bay's draft picks from the 2004 NHL Entry Draft held on June 26 and 27, 2004, at the RBC Center in Raleigh, North Carolina.

2005 Draft picks

Tampa Bay's draft picks from the 2005 NHL Entry Draft held on July 30, 2005, at the Westin Hotel in Ottawa, Ontario.

2006 Draft picks

Tampa Bay's draft picks from the 2006 NHL Entry Draft held on June 24, 2006, at General Motors Place in Vancouver, British Columbia.

2007 Draft picks

Tampa Bay's draft picks at the 2007 NHL Entry Draft held on June 22 and 23, 2007, at Nationwide Arena in Columbus, Ohio.

2008 Draft picks

Tampa Bay's picks at the 2008 NHL Entry Draft held on June 20 and 21, 2007, at Scotiabank Place in Ottawa.

2009 Draft picks 

Tampa Bay's picks at the  2009 NHL Entry Draft held on June 26–27, 2009, at the Centre Bell in Montreal.

2010 Draft picks 

Tampa Bay's picks at the 2010 NHL Entry Draft held on June 25 and 26, 2010, at the Staples Center in Los Angeles.

2011 Draft picks 

Tampa Bay's picks at the 2011 NHL Entry Draft held on June 24 and 25, 2011, at the Xcel Energy Center in St. Paul, Minnesota

2012 Draft picks 

Tampa Bay's picks at the 2012 NHL Entry Draft held on June 22 and 23, 2012, at the Consol Energy Center in Pittsburgh, Pennsylvania.

2013 Draft picks 

Tampa Bay's picks at the 2013 NHL Entry Draft held on June 30, 2013, at the Prudential Center in Newark, New Jersey.

2014 Draft picks 

Tampa Bay's picks at the 2014 NHL Entry Draft held on June 27 and 28, 2014, at the Wells Fargo Center in Philadelphia.

2015 Draft picks

Tampa Bay's picks at the 2015 NHL Entry Draft held on June 26 and 27, 2015, at BB&T Center in Sunrise, Florida.

2016 Draft picks

Tampa Bay's picks at the 2016 NHL Entry Draft held on June 24 and 25, 2016, at First Niagara Center in Buffalo, New York.

2017 NHL Draft

Tampa Bay's picks at the 2017 NHL Entry Draft held on June 23 and 24, 2017, at the United Center in Chicago, Illinois.

2018 NHL Draft

Tampa Bay's picks at the 2018 NHL Entry Draft held on June 22 and 23, 2018, at the American Airlines Center in Dallas, Texas.

2019 NHL Draft

Tampa Bay's picks at the 2019 NHL Entry Draft held on June 21 and 22, 2019, at the Rogers Arena in Vancouver, British Columbia.

2020 NHL Draft

The 2020 NHL Entry Draft was originally scheduled to be held on June 26 and 27, 2020, at the Bell Centre in Montreal, Quebec. However, on March 25, 2020, the NHL announced that the draft was postponed due to the COVID-19 pandemic. The draft was held virtually on October 6 and 7, 2020. These are the Tampa Bay Lightning's picks at the 2020 NHL Entry Draft.

2021 NHL Draft

The 2021 NHL Entry Draft was held virtually on July 23 and 24, 2021. The draft was delated by one month from its normally scheduled time of June due to the COVID-19 pandemic and the later-than-normal finish of the 2020–21 NHL season.

2022 NHL Draft

The 2022 NHL Entry Draft was held on July 7 and 8, 2022, at the Bell Centre in Montreal, Quebec.

See also
List of Tampa Bay Lightning players
1992 NHL Expansion Draft

References 
General
Tampa Bay Lightning Draft Picks on Hockey-Reference.com retrieved 2017-05-06
1992 Supplemental Draft on The Internet Hockey Database retrieved 2017-05-06
1993 Supplemental Draft on The Internet Hockey Database retrieved 2017-05-06
1994 Supplemental Draft on The Internet Hockey Database retrieved 2017-05-06
Specific

Draft
 
Tampa Bay Lightning